Peter Campbell (late 1850s – January 1883) was a Scottish footballer, who was one of the four founding members of Rangers Football Club. He made 24 Scottish Cup appearances for Rangers and scored 15 goals.

Club career
Along with fellow founding members Peter McNeil, Moses McNeil and William McBeath, Campbell played in Rangers' first ever match against Callander F.C. at Flesher's Haugh, Glasgow Green in 1872. He continued to play for Rangers until 1879, helping the club to the Scottish Cup finals of 1877 and 1879. He played briefly for English club Blackburn Rovers for the 1879–80 season before retiring from football.

On 22 February 2010, Peter Campbell was inducted into the Rangers Hall of Fame.

International career
He also represented the Scotland national team, playing twice against Wales in 1878 and in 1879, scoring in both.

International goals
Scores and results list Scotland's goal tally first.

Death
He died from drowning after his ship Saint Columba sank in the Bay of Biscay during a storm. as it ferried coal from south Wales to Bombay in 1883.

References

External links

International stats at Londonhearts.com

1850s births
1883 deaths
Scottish footballers
Scotland international footballers
Rangers F.C. players
Blackburn Rovers F.C. players
People from Rhu, Argyll and Bute
Deaths due to shipwreck at sea
Association football forwards
Sportspeople from Argyll and Bute